5-MeO-pyr-T (5-methoxy-N,N-tetramethylenetryptamine) is a lesser-known psychedelic drug.  It is the 5-methoxy analog of pyr-T.  5-MeO-pyr-T was first synthesized by Hunt & Brimblecombe, who credited S. Mitzal for characterization of chemical properties.  Later human tests were reported by Alexander Shulgin, in his book TiHKAL.  An oral dosage of 0.5 to 2 mg, and an inhaled dosage of 2–3 mg are reported.  5-MeO-pyr-T causes varying reactions, such as amnesia, tinnitus, vomiting, and a 5-MeO-DMT-like rushing sensation.  At the highest dosage reported in TiHKAL, the subject describes awakening from an apparent fugue state during which they were wandering the streets, with complete amnesia upon awakening.

Pharmacology  
Testing was performed on rats using this compound while characterizing various agonists of the 5-HT7 receptor.  It is an agonist with a Ki value of 630.96nM.

Very little other data exists about the pharmacological properties, metabolism, and toxicity of 5-MeO-pyr-T.

See also 

 Pyr-T
 Tryptamine
 Psychedelics, dissociatives and deliriants

References 

Psychedelic tryptamines